Skibo is an unincorporated community in Bassett Township, Saint Louis County, Minnesota, United States.

Geography
The community is located eight miles east of Hoyt Lakes, near Saint Louis County Road 110 (CR 110). Skibo is located within the Superior National Forest.  Bird Lake Recreation Area and the Saint Louis River are both nearby.

History
Skibo contained a post office between 1902 and 1919. The community was named after Skibo Castle in Scotland.  As of July 2019, Skibo remains disconnected from power lines, requiring its residents to be self-reliant through the use of alternative energy sources.

References

 Rand McNally Road Atlas – 2007 edition – Minnesota entry
 Official State of Minnesota Highway Map – 2011/2012 edition

Unincorporated communities in Minnesota
Unincorporated communities in St. Louis County, Minnesota